Rachias is a genus of spiders in the family Pycnothelidae, found in Brazil and Argentina.

Species
, the World Spider Catalog accepted 11 species:

Rachias aureus (Mello-Leitão, 1920) – Brazil
Rachias brachythelus (Mello-Leitão, 1937) – Brazil
Rachias caudatus (Piza, 1939) – Brazil
Rachias conspersus (Walckenaer, 1837) – Brazil
Rachias dispar (Simon, 1891) (type species) – Brazil
Rachias dolichosternus (Mello-Leitão, 1938) – Brazil
Rachias iricolor (Mello-Leitão, 1923) – Brazil
Rachias odontochilus Mello-Leitão, 1923 – Brazil
Rachias piracicabensis Piza, 1938 – Brazil
Rachias timbo Goloboff, 1995 – Argentina
Rachias virgatus Vellard, 1924 – Brazil

References

Pycnothelidae
Mygalomorphae genera
Spiders of Brazil
Spiders of Argentina